The Orel Anzio was a Minor League Baseball club that played in the Italian Baseball League in its 2006 season. 

The team was based in Anzio, a city located on the coast of the Lazio region of Italy, about 33 miles south of Rome which is noted as an important historical port.

Orel Anzio finished in last place with a 14-34 record in the nine-team league, and did not return for the next season.

Sources
 2006 Orel Anzio season at Baseball Reference
 2006 Orel Anzio roster at  Baseball.it website (Italian)

Baseball teams in Italy
Defunct minor league baseball teams
Baseball teams established in 2006
2006 establishments in Italy